When Irish Eyes Are Smiling is a Decca Records album by Bing Crosby of songs with an Irish theme. It was issued as a 10” LP as catalog No.DL 5403.  Some of the songs had earlier been issued as a 3-disc 45rpm set (9-89).
 
A later 12” LP version with the same title was issued in 1956 as DL8262 with a different selection of songs.

Background
The maternal side of Crosby’s family had come from Ireland in the 19th century and he had grown up hearing traditional Irish songs. The first Irish song he recorded was “Did Your Mother Come from Ireland?” in 1940 and from then on, songs related to the Emerald Isle were a regular part of his catalog. The success of an earlier Crosby album of Irish songs encouraged Decca to put together another album of similarly themed tracks. This included two new songs which were reviewed by Billboard as follows: 

St. Patrick’s Day Parade - Bing, in high spirits, turns on his winning Irish brogue for a sparkling etching of a new St Patty’s ditty of superior quality. Add another solid standard item to the lengthy Crosby list.

With My Shillelagh Under My Arm - Performance-wise, the same level of spirit and vigor is accomplished here but the song isn’t quite as strong as topside’s.

Track listing for 10" LP
Recording dates follow song titles.

References 

Decca Records albums
1952 albums
Bing Crosby compilation albums